Patricia Lewis may refer to:

Patricia Lewis (physicist) (born 1957), Irish nuclear physicist and arms control expert
Patricia Lewis (singer) (born 1967), South African singer, actress and television personality
Patricia C. Lewis, United States Air Force general